Moscow Chill is a 2007 Russian thriller film co-written and directed by Chris Solimine.

Plot
American computer hacker Ray Perso is brought to Russia. His client is a Russian oligarch sitting in jail. He orders him to track down and steal the money that is hidden in the "International Bank Transfer System". Unexpectedly, Ray falls in love with a girl named Maya. Having successfully breached the system Ray realizes that he has become a pawn in someone else's game, and now the fate of people Perso cares about hangs solely upon him.

Cast
Norman Reedus as Ray Perso
Konstantin Yushkevich as Vasya
Slava Schoot as Dolphin
Kseniya Buravskaya as Maya
Alexander Lenkov as Mitya
Aleksandr Yakovlev as Ivan
Valery Marionov as Eel
Yuriy Dumchev as Carp
Vladimir Kuleshov as Dubinsky

References

External links
 
 
 Moscow Chill review by Greg Wright - Christian Cinema

2007 films
2007 thriller drama films
English-language Russian films
2000s Russian-language films
Films set in Moscow
2007 thriller films
2000s English-language films
Russian multilingual films
Russian thriller drama films